CNN Millennium was a 10-part series on human history from the 11th to the 20th centuries. The Millennium series should not be confused with the CNN Millennium 2000 DVD, which documented the celebrations around the world for the arrival of the year 2000. CNN Millennium originally aired between October 24, 1999, and December 26, 1999, at 10 p.m. on Sundays. Sir Jeremy Isaacs, filmmaker of "The World at War" and CNN's Cold War, and Pat Mitchell, president of CNN Productions and Time Inc. Television, served as executive producers. The CNN website elaborates:

Each of the 10 episodes of MILLENNIUM focuses on a single century, brought to life by five vignettes from five different locations worldwide.

Inspired by Felipe Fernandez-Armesto's book, "Millennium," and filmed in 28 countries, the series is as geographically far-ranging as the world it covers. Its producers and crews spent more than two years and traveled 100,000 miles gathering footage. MILLENNIUM reconstructs the visual images of past ages using this footage, along with vivid re-enactments and computer-generated graphic animation.

MILLENNIUM is peopled with the interesting and the provocative, among them: Native Americans who built canyon housing complexes and Ethiopians who carved churches from solid rock in the 12th century; Genghis Khan, whose 13th century Mongol warriors conquered and united central Asia; Timur, who rose from sheep-stealer to conqueror and expanded Islam's empire in the 14th century; Christopher Columbus, whose 15th century voyage changed the world; African slaves taken from their homeland to serve the Americas' new colonies in the 17th century; French explorers who endured the Arctic's cold in the 18th century; Charles Darwin, whose theories of evolution challenged the 19th century's religious certainties; and the 20th century's superstars, including Charlie Chaplin and Princess Diana.

Academy Award winner Ben Kingsley narrated Millennium. But his role remained confined to introducing the subject matter and placing it into context. Main protagonists such as Genghis Khan tell their individual stories in their native tongues, relayed to viewers through simultaneous translation.

Bernard Heyes was in charge of graphic design and animation. Richard Blackford composed the original musical score for the series.

Millennium's ten episodes revolve around a common theme, or tool:

1. The 11th century is the Century of the Sword (referring to such calamitous events as the Norman conquest of England in 1066). Producer: Henry Chancellor. 
2. The 12th century features the axe (used to fell forests in order to build fleets and housing). Producers: Neil Cameron and Emma de 'Ath.
3. The stirrup moves the 13th century. Director: Caroline Ross Pirie.
4. The scythe wreaked havoc in the 14th century, due to plague outbreaks and bad weather. Directors: Mark Kidel, Peter Sommer and David Wallace.
5. The sail assisted explorers in the 15th century, from China to Spain. Producers: Neil Cameron and Emma de Ath.
6. The compass was the colonizers’ tool in the 16th century Director: Richard Curson Smith.
7. The telescope fueled expanding knowledge about earth and universe in the 17th century. Director: Neil Cameron.
8. The furnace sparked industrial and human revolutions in the 18th century. Director: Neil Cameron.
9. The machine age began with the 19th century Director: Mike Dibb.
10. The series concluded with the 20th, the Century of the Globe Producers: Neil Cameron and Emma De'Ath.
 
To complement the series, CNN Interactive created a dynamic online companion that includes animation, interactivity and 3-D effects.

Related mini-series 

Also in October 1999, the Arts and Entertainment Network (A&E) presented the three-part series Biography of the Millennium, hosted by Harry Smith. That miniseries celebrated the achievements of the most important 100 people of the past 1000 years. To assemble the program, Biography staff conducted a survey of scholars, scientists, journalists, artists and viewers. Among those asked to rank the 100 most important people of the millennium were Henry Kissinger, Kofi Annan, Isaac Stern, David Remnick and Bob Ballard.

The German book printer Johann Gutenberg was selected as the most influential among the field, due to having perfected a reliable way of transmitting knowledge – albeit not by unanimous consent. Isaac Newton placed second, followed by Martin Luther, Charles Darwin, William Shakespeare, Christopher Columbus, Karl Marx, Albert Einstein, Nicolaus Copernicus, and Galileo Galilei. The top 25 were discussed in more detail than the rest.

Assessment and availability of the two series 

Unlike CNN, A&E appears to have taken a slightly more Eurocentric view in their selections. All of the top ten personalities featured were Europeans. On the other hand, CNN Millennium endeavours to make history accessible to a culturally and socially diverse audience through the extensive use of animation, costumes and recreating places of historical significance around the world.

To date, both the CNN and Biography of the Millennium series have been made available only on VHS cassettes. A DVD has not been produced, although a CD of the Millennium soundtrack was available at the time of the broadcast.

References 

CNN original programming